Mason Middle School can refer to several schools:

 Mason Middle School in Mason, Ohio
 Mason Middle School in Proctor District, Tacoma, Washington